I'll Carry You in My Arms may refer to:
 I'll Carry You in My Arms (1943 film), a German romance film
 I'll Carry You in My Arms (1958 film), a West German drama film